Ocypetes is a genus of beetles in the family Buprestidae, containing the following species:

 Ocypetes crassicollis (Laporte & Gory, 1837)
 Ocypetes descarpentriesi (Cobos, 1973)
 Ocypetes golbachi (Cobos, 1973)
 Ocypetes irroratus (Gory, 1840)

Appearance
Medium-sized, usually matte, dark. The secondary covering wings are pulled out to a "tail" behind.

Habits 
The adult beetles like to visit flowers similar to most other species of beetles.

Prevalence 
The genus lives in southern South America (specifically Argentina).

References

Buprestidae genera